Parfois is a Portuguese women's accessories brand with fashion accessories such as handbags, jewelry, wallets, sunglasses, belts, scarves, watches, hair accessories, etc.

Parfois started as a fashion accessory brand in 1994, opening its first store in Porto, Portugal. Parfois has today around 1100 shops in 71 countries.

Parfois has continued to expand and as part of that expansion opened the online store in 2012 and started to sell their products to 20 European countries.

Products

Bags 

Parfois has different categories of bags, subdivided into handbags, wallets and travel bags. Each collection of bags usually include a large bag, smaller bags and a purse to match.

Accessories 

Parfois accessories collection includes jewellery, sunglasses, scarves(long knitwear scarves, snugs and also delicate scarves and belt, hats and gloves.

Shoes 

Besides bags and accessories, footwear can be found in Parfois stores, including heels, platform heels, wedges, flats and boots.

Clothes 
Parfois now also do a range of clothing which includes capes, short woven coats, a wide range of tops and the odd pair of knitted leggings or tracksuit style bottoms.

Gallery

References

Clothing companies of Portugal
Fashion accessory brands
Clothing companies established in 1994
1994 establishments in Portugal
Portuguese brands
Eyewear companies of Portugal
Eyewear brands of Portugal